The Buena Vista and Ellaville Railroad is a historic railroad that operated in Georgia, USA. It was originally incorporated as the Buena Vista Railroad in 1880 and the name was changed to the Buena Vista and Ellaville Railroad in 1885 following a corporate reorganization. The railroad ran  of track between Buena Vista and Americus when, in 1888, it was merged with several other lines into the Savannah and Western Railroad, a subsidiary of the Central of Georgia Railway.

See also

Defunct Georgia (U.S. state) railroads
Predecessors of the Central of Georgia Railway
Railway companies established in 1885
Railway companies disestablished in 1888
1885 establishments in Georgia (U.S. state)